Death Will Reign is the fifth studio album by American Christian deathcore band Impending Doom. The album was released on November 5, 2013, and reached No. 116 on the US Billboard 200, No. 6 on Christian Albums, No. 9 on Hard Rock Albums, No. 18 on Independent Albums and No. 26 on Top Rock Albums charts.

Track listing

Personnel
Impending Doom
 Brook Reeves – vocals
 Manny Contreras – lead guitar
 Eric Correra – rhythm guitar
 David Sittig – bass
 Brandon Trahan – drums

Additional personnel
 Will Putney – production, engineering, mixing
 Mike Milford – management

References

2013 albums
Impending Doom albums
E1 Music albums
Albums produced by Will Putney